Mark Handley is a playwright and screenwriter.

In 1977, he and his wife moved to the Pacific Northwest where they lived in isolation in a log cabin that they built themselves. He is best known for his play Idioglossia, which was later produced as Jodie Foster's film, Nell. Nell was co-written by Mr. Handley and British Dramatist William Nicholson (Shadowlands). Nell was the first production of Jodie Foster's company Egg Pictures and was directed by Michael Apted.

He currently teaches a screenwriting course in Seattle, Washington.

References

External links

American dramatists and playwrights
New Trier High School alumni
People from Hollywood, Los Angeles
Living people
Screenwriters from Illinois
Screenwriters from California
Year of birth missing (living people)